Naseem Shah (born 13 November 1973) is a British Labour Party politician. She was elected at the 2015 general election as Member of Parliament (MP) for Bradford West, winning the seat from George Galloway of the Respect Party. She has served in the Opposition frontbench since 2018, currently as Shadow Minister for Crime Reduction.

Early life
Naz Shah was born in Bradford. Her father left the family when she was six years old. At age 12, she was sent to Pakistan by her mother, Zoora Shah, to escape her mother's abusive partner, where she had an arranged marriage.

When she was 20, her mother was convicted of the murder of her partner, who had sexually and physically abused her for over a decade, and served 7 years in prison.

Early career
Before being elected as an MP, Shah was the chair of mental health charity, Sharing Voices Bradford, and had previously worked as a carer for disabled people, as an NHS Commissioner and a director for a regional association supporting local councils.

She has said that she voted for George Galloway at the Bradford West by-election in 2012.

Working with the Southall Black Sisters, Shah campaigned for her mother's release from prison.

Parliamentary career
In a secret ballot in February 2015 for selection as the Labour Party candidate for Bradford West, Amina Ali won with 142 votes against Shah's 13. However, Ali resigned shortly afterwards citing personal reasons and Shah was chosen as the candidate by the Labour Party National Executive. She won the Bradford West constituency in May 2015 with a majority of 11,420 over George Galloway. When elected, she was one of nine Muslim Labour MPs.

Shah endorsed Yvette Cooper during the Labour leadership contest in 2015. 

She was appointed as Parliamentary Private Secretary (PPS) to John McDonnell, the Shadow Chancellor of the Exchequer, in February 2016.

In April 2016, Shah was reported to have reposted in August 2014 a Facebook post with a map from Norman Finkelstein's website showing Israel superimposed on the United States, with the headline "Solution for Israel-Palestine conflict - relocate Israel into United States". She had added the comment that this might "save them some pocket money" (i.e. US funding for Israel). Finkelstein defended the map as humorous. Shah responded that her views on Israel had moderated, and stepped down as John McDonnell's PPS. Jeremy Corbyn condemned her posted comment as "offensive and unacceptable". She was suspended from the Labour Party that month, pending investigation. In July, she was reinstated but given a  formal warning for bringing the party into disrepute and told to apologise. Shah said she had shown "ignorance": that the post was antisemitic but she was not.

At the general election in June 2017, Shah was re-elected with an increased vote share, and nearly doubled her majority to 21,902 votes over the second-placed Conservative Party candidate.

In August 2017, Shah retweeted and liked a tweet from a 'parody' account claiming to belong to Labour member Owen Jones that read: "Those abused girls in Rotherham and elsewhere just need to shut their mouths. For the good of diversity". Shah deleted the retweet and unliked the original tweet. A spokesperson said: "This was a genuine accident eight days ago that was rectified within minutes." Shah also claimed to have a record on challenging abuse. In April 2018, following Winnie Madikizela-Mandela's death, Shah paid tribute by tweeting an image incorporating Mandela's quote: "Together, hand in hand, with our matches and our necklaces, we shall liberate this country", a reference to murders using petrol and tyres. She later deleted the tweet.

In July 2018, Shah was appointed Shadow Minister of State for Women and Equalities.

Shah was re-elected as the MP for Bradford West at the 2019 general election with a majority of 27,019.

On 1 October 2020, pro-Brexit group Leave.EU apologised and paid damages for libel to Shah after they made a social media post which accused her of being a "grooming gangs apologist". In a statement, Leave.EU said that their post was "ill-judged and untrue" and described Shah as a "vociferous campaigner for victims of grooming gangs".

During a 14 June 2021 parliamentary debate on whether to implement two petitions on economic sanctions against Israel and on recognising the State of Palestine, Shah warned the incoming Israeli Prime Minister, Naftali Bennett, that "if any more Palestinian blood is unjustly spilled under a perverted interpretation of a right to self-defence" that she would push for Israel to be tried before the International Criminal Court for war crimes.

Personal life
During the early 2010s, Shah was injured in a hit-and-run collision, which has left her with ongoing periodic severe nerve pain which requires hospitalisation.

References

External links

1973 births
Living people
British politicians of Pakistani descent
English Muslims
English people of Pakistani descent
Female members of the Parliament of the United Kingdom for English constituencies
Labour Party (UK) MPs for English constituencies
British expatriates in Pakistan
UK MPs 2015–2017
Independent members of the House of Commons of the United Kingdom
21st-century British women politicians
UK MPs 2017–2019
UK MPs 2019–present
Members of Parliament for Bradford West
21st-century English women
21st-century English people